Chinese Constitutional Reform Association (Chinese: 中國憲政協進會) is a political pressure organization founded in 2002 and officially established on October 11, 2005. It is currently led by Wang Dan, who was a student leader during the Tiananmen Square protests of 1989, and president Wang Juntao. Its famous members include famous physicist Fang Lizhi and former advisor of Zhao Ziyang, Yan Jiaqi. Its purpose is to push constitutional reform in People's Republic of China by political activities.

Like many of Wang Dan's web sites, the contents of this site are no longer maintained.

External links
Official website the contents of this site is no longer maintained.
Chinese democracy movements
Organizations established in 2005
Political advocacy groups in China
2005 establishments in China